Lauri Ingman's second cabinet was the 11th Government of independent Finland, serving between 31 May 1924 – 31 March 1925. It was formed following the 1924 parliamentary elections between four parties—National Coalition Party, Agrarian Party, National Progressive Party and Swedish People's Party—and had a majority in the parliament during the first six months. Overall, the cabinet lasted 305 days in office.

The cabinet lost its parliamentary majority after the Agrarian Party withdrew following a disagreement on the pension of government officials. The Ingman cabinet finally resigned four months due to defeat of an election bill in the parliament.

References

Ingman, 2
1924 establishments in Finland
1925 disestablishments in Finland
Cabinets established in 1924
Cabinets disestablished in 1925